Exposure factor (EF) is the subjective, potential percentage of loss to a specific asset if a specific threat is realized. The exposure factor is a subjective value that the person assessing risk must define.

The exposure factor is represented in the impact of the risk over the asset, or percentage of asset lost. As an example, if the asset value is reduced two thirds, the exposure factor value is 0.66. If the asset is completely lost, the exposure factor is 1.0.

Financial risk management